The 1981–82 Australian region cyclone season was an average season.  It officially started on 1 November 1981, and officially ended on 30 April 1982.

Systems

Severe Tropical Cyclone Alex
A tropical low developed from an active convergence zone on 18 October. The system intensified into a tropical cyclone the next day and received the name Alex. Alex moved southeast and steadily intensified, reaching its peak intensity with 10-minute sustained winds of 150 km/h (90 mph) and a barometric pressure of 964 hPa (28.47 inHg) on 21 October. Alex weakened as strong wind shear caused the convection and circulation to separate, dissipating on 27 October.

Tropical Cyclone Amelia
A tropical low was identified in the southern Gulf of Carpentaria on 1 December, moving steadily northwest. It soon moved over land, re-emerging off the Northern Territory coast on 3 December. Late on 4 December, the low reached tropical cyclone status, receiving the name Amelia as it moved west-southwest through the Timor Sea. Soon afterwards, however, the system fell below cyclone intensity. It drifted west-southwest over the next few days, dissipating on 8 December.

Tropical Cyclone 04U
A tropical low formed in a weak monsoon trough over the Gulf of Carpentaria early on 20 December. It moved westward and intensified, becoming a cyclone later that day, although it did not receive a name. At 1400 UTC on 20 December, it made landfall near Gove at its peak intensity with winds of 85 km/h (50 mph) and a minimum pressure of 990 hPa. The strongest winds were likely in the southern quadrants due to its rapid westward movement. The cyclone weakened as it moved over land, but emerged offshore near Darwin on the 21st. Now over water, it once again intensified to tropical cyclone intensity, reaching a secondary peak intensity with winds of 75 km/h (45 mph) and a pressure of 992 hPa. The system dissipated on 23 December.

At Gove, sustained winds of 115 km/h and gusts of over 148 km/h were recorded, the highest from the system. Extensive tree damage occurred in the Gove area, and some minor damage to ships occurred at the Nabalco Wharf.

Severe Tropical Cyclone Chris–Damia

Chris-Damia was the most intense storm of the season. Its precursor formed to the northwest of Christmas Island on 5 January, drifting slowly southwards. The system reached cycle intensity at 00:00 UTC on 7 January, receiving the name Chris. Over the next few days, Chris moved generally westwards as it steadily deepened, steered by a strong anticyclone located south of the storm. An eye became visible on satellite imagery during 9 January, and Chris reached its peak intensity with 10-minute sustained winds of 195 km/h (120 mph) and an estimated central pressure of 934 hPa during the 11th, moving into the South-West Indian Ocean later that day. Chris-Damia became the strongest storm on record in the South-West Indian Ocean at the time, with an estimated pressure of 898 hPa (mbar).

Tropical Cyclone Bruno

Tropical Cyclone Daphne–Fifi

Tropical Cyclone Errol

Errol caused heavy damage in Western Australia in January 1982.

Severe Tropical Cyclone Abigail

Tropical Cyclone Graham

Tropical Cyclone Coral
Coral formed on 4 February in the Gulf of Carpentaria, reaching cyclone status later that day. It crossed the coast on 5 February, dissipating the next day.

Tropical Cyclone Harriet

Severe Tropical Cyclone Ian

Tropical Cyclone 23S

Tropical Storm 23S existed from March 15 to March 20, 1982. While it was designated by the Joint Typhoon Warning Center, it was not warned on by the Bureau of Meteorology. It later crossed into the South-West Indian Ocean.

Severe Tropical Cyclone Bernie

Severe Tropical Cyclone Dominic

Cyclone Dominic made landfall on April 7, 1982, near Cape Keerweer.  Damage was done to buildings and power lines at Edward River Mission and Aurukun.  Wind damage was seen in Darwin and the Northern Territory.  The storm tide was 1 meter/3.3 ft at Weripa and 1.5 meter/5 ft at Karumba.  The storm left 3.6 million dollars (1982 USD) in damage.

Tropical Cyclone Claudia

See also

Atlantic hurricane seasons: 1981, 1982
Eastern Pacific hurricane seasons: 1981, 1982
Western Pacific typhoon seasons: 1981, 1982
North Indian Ocean cyclone seasons: 1981, 1982

References

Australian region cyclone seasons
Aust
Tropical cyclones in 1981
Tropical cyclones in 1982